Vidyadhar Shukla is the Chief Hindu priest of Thailand. He is of Indian ancestry.

External links
Standardize Vedic Gemology VNN- February 10, 2000
Thailand Hinduism

Vidya Dhar Shukla
Vidya Dhar Shukla
Vidya Dhar Shukla
Living people
Year of birth missing (living people)
Place of birth missing (living people)